The Gare d'Eu (Eu station) is a railway station in the commune of Eu in the Seine-Maritime department, France, in Normandy.

It is the main station for Eu; the former Eu-la Mouillette was better located but served by only one rail line.

History
The station was previously called Gare d'Eu-La Chaussée or simply Gare de la Chaussée. It was opened by the Nord company on 11 May 1872 as part of the line between Longroy-Gamaches and Le Tréport-Mers. From 4 December 1888 when the line between Abbeville and Eu was opened, it was a transfer point for passengers travelling towards Dieppe. The line between Eu and Dieppe was closed on 2 October 1938 and has been partly turned into a footpath: le chemin vert du Petit Caux (Petit-Caux greenway).

The station was also the terminus of a tramway which operated from 1902 to 1934 between Eu, Le Tréport and Mers-les-Bains, the tramway d'Eu-Le Tréport-Mers.

The SNCF sold the station to a private individual; today it is an unmanned stop with only an automatic ticket dispenser. Train services to Abbeville were discontinued in 2018.

Rail service
The Gare d'Eu is at the junction of the Abbeville–Eu line and the Épinay–Le Tréport line.

It is served by TER Hauts-de-France trains from Le Tréport-Mers to Beauvais. 

Service is with ATER X 73500, XGC and on occasion modernised X 4630 railcars.

See also 
 List of SNCF stations in Normandy

References

Railway stations in Seine-Maritime
Railway stations in France opened in 1872